Kyösti Eemil "Köpi" Lehtonen (13 March 1931 – 15 November 1987) was a lightweight Greco-Roman wrestler from Finland. He competed at the 1956, 1960 and 1964 Olympics and won a gold medal in 1956, placing fifth in 1960. Previously he won two silver medals at the world championships in 1953 and 1955. Domestically he won nine Finnish titles in 1952–57 and 1960–62. Lehtonen retired after the 1964 Olympics and coached the Norwegian (1964), Danish (1964) and Finnish national teams (1971–74). Later he was elected as a board member of the Finnish Wrestling Federation.

References

External links
 

1931 births
1987 deaths
Olympic wrestlers of Finland
Wrestlers at the 1956 Summer Olympics
Wrestlers at the 1960 Summer Olympics
Wrestlers at the 1964 Summer Olympics
Finnish male sport wrestlers
Olympic gold medalists for Finland
Olympic medalists in wrestling
World Wrestling Championships medalists
Medalists at the 1956 Summer Olympics
Finnish wrestling coaches
People from Jämsä
Sportspeople from Central Finland
20th-century Finnish people